What is man? may refer to:

In literature

Psalm 8, verse 4 begins with this question and may be the origin thereof.
What Is Man? (Twain essay), essay written by Mark Twain and published in 1906
What Is Man? (King essay), essay written by Martin Luther King Jr. and published in 1959
What Is Man?, a book by Wolfhart Pannenberg
What is Man, a 1970 book by David Jenkins
What Is Man? a 1923 work by John Arthur Thomson

In philosophy

 What is man?, a philosophical thought by Thomas Hill Green
 What is man?, a theme found in B. F. Skinner's 1971 book Beyond Freedom and Dignity

In music

"What Is Man", a song by Johnny Cash appearing on the album Personal File
"What Is Man?", a four-part composition by Charles Lloyd and Billy Higgins appearing on the 2004 album Which Way Is East